The Henry M. Jackson Foundation for the Advancement of Military Medicine (HJF) is a global non-profit organization created by Congress in 1983.

HFJ is dedicated to the advancement of military medicine, and serves as a trusted and responsive link between the military medical community, federal and private partners, and the millions of American service members, veterans, and civilians who benefit from the foundation's research.

Creation 
HJF was created to support Uniformed Services University of the Health Sciences (USUHS)[1] and throughout the military medical community. HJF was named in honor of Washington State Senator Henry "Scoop" Jackson, who sponsored the original legislation. Senator Jackson had a long-standing commitment to military medicine and health.

HJF provides scientific and management services, from infrastructure development, financial administration, clinical trials management to staffing and event planning. HJF works with a variety of programs, from large multi-site clinical trials to small, bench top projects, both nationally and abroad.

Long-time chief executive officer and president John W. Lowe retired after 25 years of serving HJF in May 2017. Retired Army Major General (Dr.) Joseph Caravalho, Jr. was named HJF CEO and president on September 1, 2017.

Partnerships & Initiatives 
In 2000, HJF established the John W. Lowe Joint Office of Technology Transfer (JOTT) in partnership with USU. This department helps scientists expedite their novel inventions, devices and technologies to possible patenting and commercialization. The office's achievements vividly illustrate a tremendous untold story about military medicine: its commitment to sharing advances with service members and civilians alike. The JOTT has won 6 Federal Laboratory Consortium awards (2012, 2013, 2014, 2016, 2017, 2018).

HJF supports hundreds of additional research projects at USUHS and throughout military medicine, including the Center for Prostate Disease Research,[4] the Center for the Study of Traumatic Stress,[6] and the Center for Disaster and Humanitarian Assistance Medicine.[7] HJF's largest program is the U.S. Military HIV Research Program (MHRP), whose mission is to protect U.S. military personnel and aid the international fight against HIV. Established in 1988, the program focuses on HIV vaccine development, prevention, disease surveillance, care and treatment for HIV.

Contracting through the Defense Department, HJF supports the work of the U.S. Army Medical Research Directorate-Africa in Nairobi, Kenya; Dar es Salaam, Tanzania; and Kampala, Uganda.

HJF employs more than 2,600 scientific, medical, management and administrative personnel around the world. HJF also manages endowments for USUHS and promotes government-civilian partnerships[8] through its Public-Private Partnerships division, part of HJF's Strategic Initiatives.[9]

Duke University Medical Center has received support services through HJF.

The HJF is part of The Surgical Critical Care Initiative (SC@i). Created in 2013 and funded by the Department of Defense's Defense Health Program, the program "brings together clinicians and scientists to gather and analyze information ranging from simple observation to bio-banked tissue samples, and makes the resulting data available for use in computerized statistical models that, critically, produce decision guidance tools that can quickly be used to improve clinical practice and outcomes."

In February 2021, USUHS and HJF entered into a Cooperative Research and Development Agreement (CRADA) with OYE Therapeutics, a Purdue University affiliated company “working to reduce the mortality and morbidity resulting from injuries on the battlefield through the development of new life-saving strategies.”

In 2022, the Department of Health and Human Services, through the National Institutes of Health, awarded the Henry M. Jackson Foundation $1.5 million to perform research into the relationship between traumatic brain injury and "anomalous health incidents" associated with Havana Syndrome.

Heroes of Military Medicine Award 
Each year since 2011, the HJF awards military medical professionals from the Army, Air Force and Navy with the Heroes of Military Medicine Award.

Major events 

1983 – Congress passes legislation form the Foundation for the Advancement of Military Medicine and authorizes the Foundation to support medical research and education at USU and throughout the military medical community.

1983 – Renamed to The Henry M. Jackson Foundation for the Advancement of Military Medicine, Inc. to honor the Senator that sponsored the legislation.

1990 – John W. Lowe becomes executive director of HJF.  HJF manages over 80 education events for the three armed services as well as the Department of Veterans Affairs.

1992 – John W. Lowe becomes CEO and president. HJF sees continued expansion in support of more than 150 research programs.

1998 – HJF celebrates 15 years of service.

1998 – HJF Fellowship program is initiated, with awards presented annually to an outstanding graduate student at USU.

2000 – HJF employs nearly 1,200 scientific, medical, management and administrative personnel and ranks in the top 7 percent of all NIH-funded organizations.

2000 – In partnership with USU, HJF establishes the Joint Office of Technology Transfer to help scientists expedite their novel inventions, devices and technologies.

2001 – HJF establishes HJF Medical Research International, a subsidiary that registers its first branch office in Kampala, Uganda, to support employees and projects in foreign jurisdictions, including Egypt, Ghana, Thailand and Uganda. The subsidiary supports MHRP.

2003 – HJF begins support of Project Phidisa, an HIV clinical research program in South Africa.

2004 – HJF ranks as top 5 percent of institutions receiving funds from NIH.

2006 – HJFMRI Ltd./Gte., an independent Nigerian company, was created to fulfill specific research program needs in Nigeria.

2007 – HJF hires 250 employees in Kenya.

2008 – HJF celebrates its 25-year anniversary.

2009 – HJF surpasses the 2,000-employee mark for the first time in its history.

2009 – The Center for Public-Private Partnerships is created.

2011 – HJF moves its headquarters from Rockville to Bethesda to be closer to USU and other major clients.

2012 – HJF marks the 100-year anniversary of its namesake's birth with nearly 2,400 employees in 106 locations.

2015 – HJF receives the Military Officers Association of America's Distinguished Service Award for outstanding support to the military and veteran community.

2016 – A regional office opens in Nairobi, Kenya, to improve customer service to sub-Saharan clients.

2017 – Dr. Joseph Caravalho is named as president and CEO to replace John W. Lowe.

2018 – HJF celebrates its 35th anniversary with its Annual Report: We Are HJF.

References

External links 
 
 HJF Names Joe Caravalho, MD, as President and CEO
 HJFMRI Official Website
 MHRP 
 Original legislation: https://www.congress.gov/bill/98th-congress/senate-bill/653 
 House record announcement of legislation: https://www.govinfo.gov/content/pkg/GPO-CRECB-1983-pt6/pdf/GPO-CRECB-1983-pt6-3-2.pdf

Educational institutions established in 1983
Military medical organizations of the United States
Medical research institutes in Maryland